Protobothrops jerdonii, also known commonly as Jerdon's pitviper, the yellow-speckled pit viper, and the oriental pit viper, is a species of venomous snake in the subfamily Crotalinae of the family Viperidae. The species is native to India, Nepal, Myanmar, China, and Vietnam. Three subspecies are recognized, including the nominate subspecies described here.

Etymology
The specific name, jerdonii, is in honor of British herpetologist Thomas C. Jerdon, who collected the type series.

The subspecific name, bourreti, is in honour of French herpetologist René Léon Bourret.

Description

Scalation: dorsal scales in 21 longitudinal rows at midbody (rarely 23); snout length a little more than twice diameter of eye; head above, except for large internasals and supraoculars, covered by small, unequal, smooth scales that are feebly imbricate or juxtaposed; first labial completely separated from nasal scales by a suture; internasals separated by 1–2 small scales; 6–9 small scales in line between supraoculars; 7–8 upper labials, third and fourth beneath eye, in contact with subocular or separated by at most a single series of small scales; ventrals: males 164–188, females 167–193; subcaudals: males 50–78, females 44–76.

Geographic range
P. jerdonii is found in northeastern India, Nepal, through northern Burma to southwestern China and Vietnam. The type locality given by Günther is "Khassya" (=Khasi Hills, India).

Subspecies

Nota bene: A trinomial authority in parentheses indicates that the subspecies was originally described in a genus other than Protobothrops.

References

Further reading

Boulenger GA (1890). The Fauna of British India, Including Ceylon and Burma. Reptilia and Batrachia. London: Secretary of State for India in Council. (Taylor and Francis, Printers). xviii + 541 pp. (Trimeresurus jerdonii, pp. 427–428).
Boulenger GA (1896). Catalogue of the Snakes in the British Museum (Natural History). Volume III., Containing the ... Viperidæ. London: Trustees of the British Museum (Natural History). (Taylor and Francis, printers). xiv + 727 pp. + Plates I-XXV. (Lachesis jerdonii, pp. 551–552).
Das I (2002). A Photographic Guide to Snakes and other Reptiles of India. Sanibel Island, Florida: Ralph Curtis Books. 144 pp. . (Protobothrops jerdonii, p. 63).
Günther A (1875). "Second Report on Collections of Indian Reptiles obtained by the British Museum". Proceedings of the Zoological Society of London 1875: 224–234. (Trimeresurus jerdonii, new species, pp. 233–234 + Plate XXXIV).
Smith MA (1943). The Fauna of British India, Ceylon and Burma, Including the Whole of the Indo-Chinese Sub-region. Reptilia and Amphibia. Vol. III.—Serpentes. London: Secretary of State for India. (Taylor and Francis, printers). xii + 583 pp. (Trimeresurus jerdoni, pp. 510–511, Figure 162).

External links

jerdonii
Snakes of China
Snakes of Vietnam
Snakes of Asia
Reptiles of China
Reptiles of India
Reptiles of Myanmar
Reptiles of Nepal
Reptiles of Vietnam
Taxa named by Albert Günther
Reptiles described in 1875